Sheykhiabad may refer to:
 Sheykhiabad-e Olya
 Sheykhiabad-e Sofla